Ronald Perlman (born April 13, 1950) is an American actor. His credits include the roles of Amoukar in Quest for Fire (1981), Salvatore in The Name of the Rose (1986), Vincent in the television series Beauty and the Beast (1987–1990), for which he won a Golden Globe Award, One in The City of Lost Children (1995), Johner in Alien Resurrection (1997), Hellboy in both Hellboy (2004) and its sequel Hellboy II: The Golden Army (2008), Clay Morrow on the television series Sons of Anarchy (2008–2013), Nino in Drive (2011) and Benedict Drask in Don't Look Up (2021).

Perlman is also known as a collaborator of Hellboy director Guillermo del Toro, having roles in the del Toro films Cronos (1993), Blade II (2002), Pacific Rim (2013), Nightmare Alley (2021), and Pinocchio (2022). His voice-over work includes the narrator of the post-apocalyptic game series Fallout (1997–present), Clayface in the DC Animated Universe, Slade in Teen Titans (2003–2006), Mr. Lancer in Danny Phantom (2004–2007), Lord Hood in the video games Halo 2 (2004) and Halo 3 (2007), the Stabbington brothers in Tangled (2010), The Lich in Adventure Time (2011–2017), Xibalba in The Book of Life (2014) and Optimus Primal in both the Transformers: Power of the Primes (2018) animated series, and the forthcoming film Transformers: Rise of the Beasts (2023).

Early life 
Ronald Perlman was born on April 13, 1950 in Washington Heights, New York City. His mother, Dorothy (née Rosen; 1921–2018), was a municipal employee, and his father, Bertram "Bert" Perlman (1919–1969), was a jazz drummer and television repairman. His family is Jewish, originally from Hungary and Poland, and Perlman had a Bar Mitzvah ceremony.

Perlman said in 1988, "It was not a bad childhood but I had a perception of myself that was... I was terribly overweight as a young kid, and it was sort of a low self image." He stated this experience is something that attracts him to roles where he portrays "these sorts of deformed people who are very endearing." Perlman had a "very close" relationship with his father, who convinced his son he "had to" pursue a career as an actor after seeing him perform in a college production of Guys and Dolls. He graduated from George Washington High School in 1967 and Lehman College in 1971. He later attended the University of Minnesota where he graduated with a master's degree in theater arts in 1973.

Career

Film and television

Perlman started his career as a stage actor, appearing in various productions, and made his feature film debut in Jean-Jacques Annaud's film Quest for Fire (1981). Annaud later revealed that when he contacted Perlman to ask him about playing Salvatore in The Name of the Rose (1986), Perlman was thinking of abandoning his career. After various minor and supporting roles in films and television series, his breakthrough role came when he played Vincent on the television series Beauty and the Beast, opposite Linda Hamilton, from 1987 to 1990. This earned him a Golden Globe Award for Best Performance by an Actor in a Television Series in 1989.

He went on to play roles in many films and television series throughout the 1980s and 1990s as well as the 2000s. His most notable film appearances were in films such as The Name of the Rose (1986), Romeo is Bleeding (1993), The Adventures of Huck Finn (1993), Police Academy: Mission to Moscow (1994), The Last Supper (1995), The Island of Dr. Moreau (1996), Alien Resurrection (1997), Enemy at the Gates (2001), Blade II and Star Trek: Nemesis (both 2002) and two Stephen King adaptations, Sleepwalkers and Desperation. His appearances on television series include Highlander: The Series, The Outer Limits, The Magnificent Seven, and the Amazon series Hand of God.

He played his first leading film role in 1995, when he played "One" in Jean-Pierre Jeunet and Marc Caro's French-language The City of Lost Children. In 2003, Perlman starred in a commercial for Stella Artois beer. This commercial, which was called "Devil's Island", won a Silver Award at the 2003 British Advertising Awards. He got another leading film role in 2004 when he played the title role in the comic book adaptation Hellboy. Perlman reprised his role as Hellboy in the straight to DVD animated features Hellboy: Sword of Storms (2006) and Hellboy: Blood and Iron (2007) as well as Hellboy II: The Golden Army, released on July 11, 2008.

In 2008, Perlman joined the cast of the television series Sons of Anarchy on FX playing Clay Morrow, the national president of the Sons of Anarchy Motorcycle Club. He also played Wes Chandler in the second and third seasons of StartUp in 2017–18.

In 2022 Perlman starred in Steven Brand's noir thriller Joe Baby alongside Dichen Lachman, Willa Fitzgerald and Harvey Keitel.

Voice-over work 

Perlman also has a successful career as a voice actor. He has portrayed characters in numerous video games and animated series, and done voice-over work for television commercials. These include Casper High English teacher and vice-principal Mr. Lancer in Danny Phantom, "Mickey Kaline" in Hey Arnold, The Lich in Adventure Time, Kurtis Stryker in Mortal Kombat: Defenders of the Realm, Justice in Afro Samurai and various characters in DC Comics based series such as the villainous Slade, a version of DC character Deathstroke in the Teen Titans animated series and again in Justice League: The Flashpoint Paradox, Clayface in Batman: The Animated Series and The New Batman Adventures, Jax-Ur in Superman: The Animated Series, Orion in Justice League and Justice League Unlimited (the former in which he reprised his role as Clayface as well as voice Orion), Sozin in Avatar: The Last Airbender, several villains (Killer Croc, Rumor and Bane) in The Batman, Doctor Double X in Batman: The Brave and the Bold, and Sinestro in Green Lantern: The Animated Series. In addition, he served as the narrator for 1000 Ways To Die.

His video game credits include Terrence Hood in the games Halo 2 and Halo 3, Jagger Valance in The Chronicles of Riddick: Escape from Butcher Bay, and Batman in Justice League Heroes. He is well known by Fallout fans for narrating the introductory movies in the series, including uttering the famous phrase "War. War never changes." He also voices "Slade" in the 2008 Turok game, and Emil Blonsky / Abomination in Incredible Hulk: Ultimate Destruction, Conan for the PS3 and Xbox 360, and voices the fast-talking Mayor Hoodoo Brown in the Neversoft game Gun. He also made an appearance in Payday 2 as "Rust", part of the "Biker Pack" DLC. In Call of Duty: Black Ops III (2016), Perlman offered his likeness and voice to one of the lead playable characters in the game's popular Zombies mode.

Perlman has also provided narration for a number of audiobooks, including City of Thieves by David Benioff.  Perlman also does narration in the UFC's cold open promos for pay-per-view events.

Personal life 
Perlman married Opal, a jewelry designer, on February 14, 1981.
They separated in May 2019 and Perlman later filed for divorce. On June 28, 2022 it was announced that Perlman married Allison Dunbar in Italy after three years of dating. His son produces electronic music under the stage name Delroy Edwards.

Perlman described himself as a lifelong Democrat in November 2016. He has been a vocal critic of former U.S. President Donald Trump. 

On June 25, 2018, Perlman claimed that he intentionally urinated on his hand prior to shaking Harvey Weinstein's hand followed by the message "I think about that every time lil Donnie opens up his KFC."

On November 9, 2016, Perlman announced via Facebook his intention to run for U.S. President in the 2020 election. In January 2019, he endorsed the candidacy of Kamala Harris.

Filmography

Books

References

External links 

 
 
 
 
 

1950 births
20th-century American Jews
20th-century American male actors
21st-century American male actors
21st-century American Jews
American Ashkenazi Jews
American male film actors
American male television actors
American male video game actors
American male voice actors
American people of Hungarian-Jewish descent
American people of Polish-Jewish descent
Audiobook narrators
Best Drama Actor Golden Globe (television) winners
California Democrats
Comedians from New York City
George Washington Educational Campus alumni
Jewish American male actors
Jewish American male comedians
Lehman College alumni
Living people
Male actors from New York City
New York (state) Democrats
People from Washington Heights, Manhattan
University of Minnesota College of Liberal Arts alumni